Der Freiwillige was a German magazine, published from 1956 as the official organ of HIAG. In 2014, it was merged into .

References

 
 
 

1956 establishments in Germany
Neo-Nazi publications